The East Indiamen of the British East India Company (EIC) passed many places and stopped at many ports on their voyages from Britain to India and China in the 17th to 19th centuries, both on the way and as destinations. Some of these places were simply landmarks, but a number of the places were the locations of EIC factories, i.e., trading posts.

In many cases the spelling of the names of these locations has changed between then and now. One purpose of this list is to link, where possible, the names as given in ships' logs with the modern name. Names in italics represent cases where the modern and older name are different.

A
Acheh 
Amboina (Ambonya)
Amoy
Amsterdam Island
Anger or Anjere, or Anjer
Angra Pequeña
Anjengo - site of Anchuthengu Fort & EIC factory (1684-1813)
Annobon
Antique, Panay
 Ascension Island

BBabelmandel IslandBalambanganBalasore; Balasore Roads is about 125 miles south of Calcutta; it provided a sheltered anchorage for vessels awaiting a pilot or favourable winds to take them upriver, or to transfer cargoBally Town is on the Hooghli River, slightly north of Calcutta
 Banaca 
BandaBancoot - about 75 miles SE of Bombay, on the Savitri River. 
Bandar Abbas
Banjarmasin (See also Tamborneo)
 Bankshall - general term for the office of harbor-master or other port authority; at Calcutta the office stood on the banks of the Hooghli
Bantam; see also Banten Sultanate
Barrabulla or Barra Bulla is a sandbank that forms near Kedgeree (see below) in the Hooghli River.BasaraBass StraitBassein a city in Maharashtra state, India; known as Bassein to the Portuguese and BritishBataviaBencoomat Benkulen or Bencoolen; see also Fort Marlborough
Benguela
Bimilipatnam (or Bhimili)Billiton is an island that also gave its name to a strait. See also Caramata. Billiton and Caramata islands flank a passage that connects the South China Sea to the Java SeaBona VistaBocca Tigris, or BogueBombayBouruBurah Bazaar Busher (Bushire)

CCagayan SuluCalcuttaCalicutCalingapatamCannanore Cap Sing-Moon passage: A waterway between the northern tip of Lantoa and the Chinese mainland. Mah Wan Island splits the Passage into two channels, the narrower channel between Lanoa/Lantau and Ma Wan, and the wider between Ma Wan and the mainland. Also: Kumsingmoon.
Cape of Good Hope; equally Cape ColonyCape Comorin Cape San Diego, the easternmost point of the Mitre Peninsula, on Tierra del FuegoCaramata )Caramata Passage; see also Billiton. Carnicobar, or Car Nicobar 
Chumpee (or Chuenpee, or Chuenpi) in the Bocca Tigris, the estuary of the Pearl RiverChusanCochinCochin ChinaColvin's Ghat - a landing place (Ghat) at the offices of Colvin & Company, shippers, which were situated on the waterfront on the Hugli in CalcuttaComoroone - alternate name for Bandar AbbasCondoreConinga or Cocanada; sometimes referred to as JaggernaickpuramCoupang or Copang Bay, on the island of Timor
CoringaCortivyCovelong (Kovalam) 
Cox's Island: a small island merged into the north end of Saugor Island at the mouth of the Hooghly
Crooe (Optical character recognition may render this as "Croce") - Krui , about seven miles SE of Pisang Island
Cuddalore
Culpee (Coulpy, Kulpi, Kalpi, or Kulpee): an anchorage towards Calcutta, and just below Diamond Harbour. Opposite Diamond Point.

D-H
DamanDelagoa BayDiamond Harbour is about 41 miles south of Calcutta on the east side of the Hooghli.Diamond Point 
Diu
Dryon, Straits of (by Pulau Durian in the Riau Archipelago)
Eastern Channel (of the Hugli River) 
False Bay
Fernando de Noronha
Fort St. David
Fort St. George, India, also MadrasFrederiksnagore (Surampore)
Fulta (or Fultah) - one of several related locations (Fultah village, Fultah point, etc.) on the Hooghli River. It is not the present day Fulta, which is much farther south. It may be the present day Falta.
Galle
Ganjam
Garden Reach
GoaGombroon - alternate name for Bandar Abbas
Gorée
Great Nanka: one of the three Nanka Islands, which lie in Banka Strait, just off Banka Island (Palau Banka), which is part of the Banka Belitung Islands group.
Gressee, Grissee, or Griessie is Grisik, the capital city of Gresik Regency, and about three leagues NNW from Surabaya
Hog River Creek is a point on the Hooghli between Kidderpore and Kedgeree
Hong Kong BayHugli or Hooghli River

I-JIle de RhéIndremayo, or Indramayo 
Ingeli (or Hijili, Engelee, Ingelee, or Hidgelee): a point on the west side of the Hooghli Estuary
Ipoh = Ipuh ; west coast of Sumatra, not the city in Malaysia
 Jagarall Creek, near Calcutta
Jambi - EIC factory 1613-1681Jaggernaickpuram (or Jaggernaikpoeram, or Jagannathapuram). Also known as Cocinga or Cocanada
Jari - possibly Jarajah on the west coast of Sumatra near Bantal.JohannaK-MKamree Roads (Kamree may represent a mis-transcription of Ramree)Karakaul Karrack (or Karrach)
Karwar
KedahKedgeree (or Kijari, or Cutgerie, or Cajoree), a point on the Hoogly halfway between Calcutta and Saugor (see below), and a place where the river widens into a basin
Kidderpore
KinsaleKissim Bay or Kishm, or KisseemLintin IslandLinton - probably Lintin
LombokMadapollam , (or Madhavayapalem) MadrasMadura Island
Madeira
Mahé
Mahim 
Maio, Cape Verde
Malacca
Malwa – probably a mis-transcription for Malvan  ManagaloreManila 
Manna Point or Town, southeast of Bengkulu, on the west coast of Sumatra; now ManaMasulipatam 
 Matavai, Tahiti
 Mew Bay - about two miles east of Tanjung Layar
 Mew Island – aka Cantae, is an island in Mew BayMokhaMoco MocoMuscat

N-RNarsiporeNagoreNegapatamNew Anchorage, Calcutta, near Diamond Harbour and Kedgeree
Nicobar Islands, or Nicobars.
Norfolk Island 
North Island - the northernmost of three islands in the bay that formed the principle anchorage of Enggano Island OnoreOnreat – probably Onrust Island
Padang
PattaniPedro Branco , is an island of white rock at the east end of the Singapore Strait. It is now the site of Horsburgh Lighthouse
PenangPerates  - site where the East Indiaman  wrecked on 22 October 1800 with the loss of all passengers and crew.
Pisang or Pulau Pisang,, an island off the south coast of Sumatra, between Benkulen and Bengkunat (Bencoomat) 
Pissang, or Pulo Pesang; in the 18th century, Pulau Pemanggil was known as Pissang.Point de GallePondicherryPoolo Bay, a bay some nine miles southward of Fort Marlborough, Bengkulu (city) 
Port Cornwallis, on Ross Island in the Andaman IslandsPorto NovoPorto PrayaPriamanPring: a pepper port some 16 miles northwest of Manna Point, on the west coast of Sumatra
Pulo Bay - a now silted-up natural harbor about eight miles southward of Benkulen (Benkulu).QishmQuedah - KedahQuilonRajah Basah (or Raja Basa) Roads. Named for the volcano on the Sunda Strait, located at the most south-eastern point of Sumatra . The Roads are in Lampung Bay.RangoonRat Island: a small island west of Bengkulu
Resolution Bay, Vanuatu; Captain James Cook named the bay after his vessel 
Rio de Janeiro
Rodrigues
Rogues River: a section of the Hooghly River

SSt Augustine's BaySt Helena 
Sadras RoadsSamarangSambava
Sambroke, or Samkoke, or Samkokm or Samoke is probably the island also known at the time as Pyramid Island. This seems to be Hòn Dung, Nha Trang, Vietnam .Saugor: is at the mouth of the Hooghli, about 100 miles downriver from Calcutta 
St Paul's Island
Saldanha Bay
Saloomah, or Saloomale; on the coast of Sumatra between Fort Marlborough and Manna Point. Now Pasarseluma, Seluma SelatanSt. Salvador, or San Salvadore, or SalvadorSanta Cruz
Santiago, Cape Verde, or São Tiago, or St Jago
Sapi (or Sape, or Sapeh) Town 
Scindy road - probably the roadstead of Sindh, i.e., the waters off KarachiSecond Bar - about 20 miles before WhampoaSeverndroog (Suvarnadurg), not to be confused with the inland fort of Savandurga, sometimes also called Severndroog 
Sillebar or Silebar - on the Strait of Malacca on the north coast of Sumatra: 
Simon's Bay
Sukadana
Sulu
Surabaya Surampore 
SuratSwallyT-WTamborneo or TomborneoTapanooli, Tappanooli, Tapanuli, or Tarapouly, Sumatra — possibly modern Tapnoeli or Tapian Nauli — site of an EIC factory
Teneriffe TeinchinTiku TimorTellicherryToonkoon, or Toon Kwoon, a district between Hong Kong and CantonTranquebarTrengganu 
TrincomaleeTrinidadeTristan de CunhaTumala Punta Tryamong; also an EIC factory site, possibly also known as Priaman.Urmston's Bay, formerly (pre-1823) Toon-Koo HarbourVizagapatamWhampoa or Whampoa anchorage

Unidentified locations
 "Broken Ground" - a place or region between Bengal and Madras; possibly a section of the Hoogli between Ingeli and Barrabula 
 Capshee Bay
 Caipang Bay
 Cockelee
 Doens (probably a typographical error for The Downs.)
 Jangarall Creek, Calcutta
 Hollis Bay (possibly a miss-transcription of Wallis Bay)
 Lombon Strait (not Lombok Strait)
 Monsourcottah – probably near Ganjam
 Pulo Massey (or Pulo Masey) - possibly Sumbawa, in the Lesser Sunda Islands group.

See also
List of Dutch East India Company trading posts and settlements

References
Erikson, Emily (2014) Between Monopoly and Free Trade: The English East India Company, 1600-1757: The English East India Company, 1600-1757. (Princeton University Press). 

Horsburgh, James. (1836) India Directory or Directions for Sailing to and from the East Indies, China, New Holland, Cape of Good Hope, and the interjacent Ports, compiled chiefly from original Journals and Observations made during 21 years' experience in navigating those Seas'' 4th Edn. W. H. Allen, London.

British East India Company
Ships of the British East India Company